This article lists some important classes of matrices used in mathematics, science and engineering. A matrix (plural matrices, or less commonly matrixes) is a rectangular array of numbers called entries. Matrices have a long history of both study and application, leading to diverse ways of classifying matrices. A first group is matrices satisfying concrete conditions of the entries, including constant matrices. Important examples include the identity matrix given by

and the zero matrix of dimension . For example:

.

Further ways of classifying matrices are according to their eigenvalues, or by imposing conditions on the product of the matrix with other matrices. Finally, many domains, both in mathematics and other sciences including physics and chemistry, have particular matrices that are applied chiefly in these areas.

Constant matrices 

The list below comprises matrices whose elements are constant for any given dimension (size) of matrix. The matrix entries will be denoted aij. The table below uses the Kronecker delta δij for two integers i and j which is 1 if i = j and 0 else.

Specific patterns for entries 
The following lists matrices whose entries are subject to certain conditions. Many of them apply to square matrices only, that is matrices with the same number of columns and rows. The main diagonal of a square matrix is the diagonal joining the upper left corner and the lower right one or equivalently the entries ai,i. The other diagonal is called anti-diagonal (or counter-diagonal).

Matrices satisfying some equations 
A number of matrix-related notions is about properties of products or inverses of the given matrix. The matrix product of a m-by-n matrix A and a n-by-k matrix B is the m-by-k matrix C given by

This matrix product is denoted AB. Unlike the product of numbers, matrix products are not commutative, that is to say AB need not be equal to BA. A number of notions are concerned with the failure of this commutativity. An inverse of square matrix A is a matrix B (necessarily of the same dimension as A) such that AB = I. Equivalently, BA = I. An inverse need not exist. If it exists, B is uniquely determined, and is also called the inverse of A, denoted A−1.

Matrices with conditions on eigenvalues or eigenvectors

Matrices generated by specific data

Matrices used in statistics
The following matrices find their main application in statistics and probability theory.
Bernoulli matrix —  a square matrix with entries +1, −1, with equal probability of each.
Centering matrix — a matrix which, when multiplied with a vector, has the same effect as subtracting the mean of the components of the vector from every component.
Correlation matrix — a symmetric n×n matrix, formed by the pairwise correlation coefficients of several random variables.
Covariance matrix — a symmetric n×n matrix, formed by the pairwise covariances of several random variables. Sometimes called a dispersion matrix.
Dispersion matrix — another name for a covariance matrix.
Doubly stochastic matrix — a non-negative matrix such that each row and each column sums to 1 (thus the matrix is both left stochastic and right stochastic)
Fisher information matrix — a matrix representing the variance of the partial derivative, with respect to a parameter, of the log of the likelihood function of a random variable.
Hat matrix — a square matrix used in statistics to relate fitted values to observed values.
Orthostochastic matrix — doubly stochastic matrix whose entries are the squares of the absolute values of the entries of some orthogonal matrix
Precision matrix — a symmetric n×n matrix, formed by inverting the covariance matrix. Also called the information matrix.
Stochastic matrix — a non-negative matrix describing a stochastic process.  The sum of entries of any row is one.
Transition matrix — a matrix representing the probabilities of conditions changing from one state to another in a Markov chain
Unistochastic matrix — a doubly stochastic matrix whose entries are the squares of the absolute values of the entries of some unitary matrix

Matrices used in graph theory
The following matrices find their main application in graph and network theory.
Adjacency matrix — a square matrix representing a graph, with aij non-zero if vertex i and vertex j are adjacent.
Biadjacency matrix — a special class of adjacency matrix that describes adjacency in bipartite graphs.
Degree matrix — a diagonal matrix defining the degree of each vertex in a graph.
Edmonds matrix — a square matrix of a bipartite graph.
Incidence matrix — a matrix representing a relationship between two classes of objects (usually vertices and edges in the context of graph theory).
Laplacian matrix — a matrix equal to the degree matrix minus the adjacency matrix for a graph, used to find the number of spanning trees in the graph.
Seidel adjacency matrix — a matrix similar to the usual adjacency matrix but with −1 for adjacency; +1 for nonadjacency; 0 on the diagonal.
Skew-adjacency matrix — an adjacency matrix in which each non-zero aij is 1 or −1, accordingly as the direction i → j matches or opposes that of an initially specified orientation.
Tutte matrix — a generalization of the Edmonds matrix for a balanced bipartite graph.

Matrices used in science and engineering
Cabibbo–Kobayashi–Maskawa matrix — a unitary matrix used in particle physics to describe the strength of flavour-changing weak decays.
Density matrix — a matrix describing the statistical state of a quantum system. Hermitian, non-negative and with trace 1.
Fundamental matrix (computer vision) — a 3 × 3 matrix in computer vision that relates corresponding points in stereo images.
Fuzzy associative matrix — a matrix in artificial intelligence, used in machine learning processes.
Gamma matrices — 4 × 4 matrices in quantum field theory.
Gell-Mann matrices — a generalization of the Pauli matrices; these matrices are one notable representation of the infinitesimal generators of the special unitary group SU(3).
Hamiltonian matrix — a matrix used in a variety of fields, including quantum mechanics and linear-quadratic regulator (LQR) systems.
Irregular matrix — a matrix used in computer science which has a varying number of elements in each row.
Overlap matrix — a type of Gramian matrix, used in quantum chemistry to describe the inter-relationship of a set of basis vectors of a quantum system.
S matrix — a matrix in quantum mechanics that connects asymptotic (infinite past and future) particle states.
Scattering matrix - a matrix in Microwave Engineering that describes how the power move in a multiport system.
State transition matrix — exponent of state matrix in control systems.
Substitution matrix — a matrix from bioinformatics, which describes mutation rates of amino acid or DNA sequences.
Supnick matrix — a square matrix used in computer science.
Z-matrix — a matrix in chemistry, representing a molecule in terms of its relative atomic geometry.

Specific matrices
Wilson matrix, a matrix used as an example for test purposes.

Other matrix-related terms and definitions

Jordan canonical form — an 'almost' diagonalised matrix, where the only non-zero elements appear on the lead and superdiagonals.
Linear independence — two or more vectors are linearly independent if there is no way to construct one from linear combinations of the others.
Matrix exponential — defined by the exponential series.
Matrix representation of conic sections
Pseudoinverse — a generalization of the inverse matrix.
Row echelon form — a matrix in this form is the result of applying the forward elimination procedure to a matrix (as used in Gaussian elimination).
Wronskian — the determinant of a matrix of functions and their derivatives such that row n is the (n−1)th derivative of row one.

See also
Perfect matrix

Notes

References
 

Mathematics-related lists
 Named